Las Piedras may refer to:

Las Piedras, Artigas, a suburb of Bella Unión, Uruguay
Las Piedras, Puerto Rico, a town and municipality in the central eastern region of the island
Las Piedras, Uruguay, a city in the Canelones Department
Las Piedras, Venezuela, a town and sea port in the Punto Fijo metropolitan area
Las Piedras District, in Tambopata province, Peru
Piedras River (Peru)